Achromobacter arsenitoxydans is a Gram-negative, strictly aerobic, rod-shaped bacterium from the genus Achromobacter which was isolated from soil of an arsenic-contaminated pig farm. Achromobacter arsenitoxydans has the ability to oxidize arsenite to arsenate. The complete genome of A. arsenitoxydans has been sequenced.

See also
 List of sequenced bacterial genomes

References 

Burkholderiales